Allentiac (Alyentiyak), also known as Huarpe (Warpe), was one of two known Warpean languages. It was native to Cuyo in Argentina, but was displaced to Chile in the late 16th century. Luis de Valdivia, a Jesuit missionary, wrote a grammar, vocabulary and religious texts. The people became mestizo and lost their language soon after.

References 

Huarpean languages
Extinct languages of South America
Languages of Argentina
Languages of Chile
Languages extinct in the 17th century